Chionodes chlorocephala is a moth in the family Gelechiidae. It is found in North America, where it has been recorded from New Mexico, California and Mexico.

References

Chionodes
Moths described in 1932
Moths of North America